Halfway Creek may refer to:

Halfway Creek Site, an archaeological site located near Carnestown, Florida
Halfway Creek (Indiana), a stream in Indiana
Halfway Creek (Hyco River tributary), a stream in Halifax County, Virginia